Banca del Monte di Lucca S.p.A. is an Italian bank. It was related to charity organization Fondazione Banca del Monte di Lucca which they were split in 1990s.

Bank
The predecessor of the bank, a mount of piety, was founded in 1489. The bank was later changed the denomination to Monte di Credito su Pegno di Lucca due to a banking reform, despite the "Monte" reflected the mount of piety root.

Due to another banking reform in 1990s, the organization was split into a società per azioni and a banking foundation in 1992.

Banca Monte Lucca, and the savings banks of Florence, Livorno, Lucca, Pisa, Pistoia, San Miniato, also formed a loose banking group: Holding Casse Toscane in the same year. In 1996, CR Pisa, Livorno, Lucca and Banca Monte Lucca quit the group and formed Holding Casse del Tirreno. In 1999 the three savings banks were acquired by Banca Popolare di Lodi. In 2000 Banca Carige acquired 51% shares of Banca Monte Lucca S.p.A.. The foundation sold a further 20% in 2013 to Fondazione Cassa di Risparmio di Lucca.

Banking foundation
The former majority owner of the bank, Fondazione Banca del Monte di Lucca (the banking foundation), was a minority owner of Cassa Depositi e Prestiti for 114,348 shares. The foundation also owned 0.1545% of Banca Carige.

The foundation also carried arts exhibition in the United States.

References

External links
  
 Fondazione Banca del Monte di Lucca 

Banks established in the 1480s
Banks established in 1992
1489 establishments in Europe
15th-century establishments in Italy
Banks of Italy
Companies based in Lucca
Banca Carige
Mounts of piety
Re-established companies
Italian  companies established in 1992